Tabernaemontana amygdalifolia is a species of plant in the family Apocynaceae. It is native to southern Mexico, Central America, Cuba, Haiti, and northwestern South America.

References

amygdalifolia
Flora of Mexico
Flora of South America
Plants described in 1760
Taxa named by Nikolaus Joseph von Jacquin